Fred Meyer (9 August 1910 – 1 October 1996) was an American gymnast who competed in the 1932 Summer Olympics and in the 1936 Summer Olympics.

References

1910 births
1996 deaths
American gymnasts
Gymnasts at the 1932 Summer Olympics
Gymnasts at the 1936 Summer Olympics
Olympic silver medalists for the United States in gymnastics
Medalists at the 1932 Summer Olympics